Anolis williamsmittermeierorum, Williams-Mittermeier anole, is a species of lizard in the family Dactyloidae. The species is found in Ecuador and Peru.

References

Anoles
Reptiles described in 2007
Reptiles of Ecuador
Reptiles of Peru